HK1 is an enzyme.

HK1 or HK-1 may also refer to:

 HK-1, the original designation of the aircraft Hughes H-4 Hercules
 Heinonen HK-1, a Finnish sport aircraft
 Kimura HK-1, a Japanese experimental aircraft
 (127934) 2003 HK1, a minor planet